The 1900–01 Sheffield Shield season was the ninth season of the Sheffield Shield, the domestic first-class cricket competition of Australia. Victoria won the championship. In January 1901, in the match between New South Wales and South Australia, New South Wales scored 918 runs in their first innings, with five batsmen scoring centuries.

Table

Statistics

Most Runs
Clem Hill 620

Most Wickets
Jack Saunders 29 & Ike Travers 29

References

Sheffield Shield
Sheffield Shield
Sheffield Shield seasons